Osborne, South Australia is a suburb in the Adelaide metropolitan area in South Australia

Osborne, South Australia may also refer to articles about places in the suburb.

Osborne Naval Shipyard
Osborne railway station
Osborne Power Station

See also
Osborne (disambiguation)